KDON-FM (102.5 MHz "K-Don") is a commercial radio station licensed to Salinas, California, and serving the Monterey - Salinas - Santa Cruz radio market and the Central California Coast.  It broadcasts a rhythmic contemporary format and is owned by iHeartMedia, Inc.  The studios are on Moffett Street in Salinas.

KDON-FM has an effective radiated power of 15,000 watts.  The transmitter is on San Juan Grade Road, atop Fremont Peak in Prunedale, California.

History

KSBW-FM
Its original call sign was KSBW-FM. It was the counterpart to KSBW 1380 AM (now off the air) and KSBW-TV Channel 8 (now owned by Hearst Television). 

KSBW-FM at first simulcast the programming on KSBW 1380 AM.  But by the late 1960s, it was broadcasting an automated beautiful music format.  It featured quarter-hour sweeps of soft instrumental cover versions of adult pop music, with limited talk and commercials.

Top 40 and Rhythmic Contemporary
KSBW-FM became a Top 40/CHR station as KDON-FM in the early 1980s.  The KDON call sign has a Top 40 heritage in the Monterey-Salinas market going back to the mid-1960s, when it was used on 1460 AM.  The AM station on 1460 kHz gave up those call letters and its Top 40 format to become a talk radio station.  KDON-FM began as an automated Top 40 station with no disc jockeys.  This was not uncommon for FM Top 40 stations in those days, when most radios only received AM stations.  As the years progressed and more listeners switched to the FM band, on-air personalities were added.

The format evolved into Rhythmic Contemporary by 1988 and since then has remained one of the highest rated stations in the Monterey-Salinas-Santa Cruz radio market.

In the early nineties, Mancow Muller hosted a local morning show on KDON.  (He would later go onto success as a morning host in Chicago and syndicated around the country.)  Other talent that has come out of KDON-FM include MTV's "Lucious Liz" and others who have gone on to bigger radio markets working the early part of their careers at KDON.

Station activities
KDON-FM currently plays mainly Pop, Dance, and Hip Hop, with some R&B and Old School influence. Its signature yearly concert "The Freestyle Explosion" is a big event in Salinas each year. The station is known for its strong signal which has been heard as far north as Santa Rosa, as far east as Santa Nella and as far south as King City. It puts a city-grade signal into San Jose, and can be heard in other parts of the San Francisco Bay Area.  (It can sometimes cause interference with Sacramento station KSFM, which has the same format and same frequency, as their signals collide midway in the Bay Area).

Some of the staff previously worked at sister station 94.9 KYLD San Francisco, bringing a major market "feel" to the medium-sized Monterey market. KDON features a morning bit known as "Phone Jack at the 50."  The personalities prank-call people using different character voices. The station has an active promotions team, and Mixshow roster, which features DJs from local clubs.  Each year KDON is involved in several community events, including food drives, raising money for the Relay For Life Foundation, and christmas tree deliveries.

References

External links
102.5 KDON's website

FCC History Cards for KDON

DON
Rhythmic contemporary radio stations in the United States
Radio stations established in 1960
IHeartMedia radio stations
1960 establishments in California